Dana Sue Lepofsky (born 1958) is a Canadian archaeologist and ethnobiologist. She is a professor at Simon Fraser University, a former president of the Society of Ethnobiology, and received the Smith-Wintemberg Award in 2018. Her research focuses on the historical ecology of the indigenous peoples of the Pacific Northwest Coast.

Education and career 
Lepofsky grew up in Norwalk, CT. Lepofsky studied at the University of Michigan (BA), the University of British Columbia (MA, 1985) and the University of California, Berkeley (PhD, 1995). Her doctoral dissertation was on paleoethnobotany in Polynesia. She has been a professor at Simon Fraser University (SFU) since 1995.

Lepofsky's research centers on the indigenous peoples of the Pacific Northwest Coast and how they interacted with their environment in the past. She significantly revised anthropological thinking on the historical ecology of the Northwest Coast by showing that indigenous communities there have a long history of intensively managing coastal food resources. In particular, she has demonstrated the antiquity of herring fishing and clam gardens in the region, the latter going back at least 3,500 years. Lepofsky's research is multidisciplinary, combining archaeology, paleoethnobotany, historical ecology, and incorporating traditional knowledge from indigenous peoples.

Her work has been noted for its engagement with indigenous communities and in 2017 she received the Warren Gill Award for Community Impact from SFU. She has also served as the president of the Society of Ethnobiology and, in 2018, received the Smith-Wintemberg Award from the Canadian Archaeological Association. She has been the editor-in-chief of the Journal of Ethnobiology since 2013.

Selected publications

References 

1958 births
Canadian archaeologists
Ethnobiologists
Canadian women archaeologists
Academic staff of Simon Fraser University
University of Michigan alumni
University of British Columbia alumni
University of California, Berkeley alumni
Living people
20th-century archaeologists
21st-century archaeologists
Canadian expatriates in the United States
Academic journal editors